Minnesota State Highway 46 (MN 46) is a  highway in north-central Minnesota, which runs from its intersection with U.S. Highway 2 near Deer River (northwest of Grand Rapids) and continues northwest to its northern terminus at its intersection with State Highway 1 in Northome.

Route description
Highway 46 serves as a northwest–southeast route between the communities of Deer River, Squaw Lake, and Northome.

The roadway passes through the Chippewa National Forest in Itasca County.

The northern terminus for Highway 46 is its intersection with State Highway 1 in Northome, 5 blocks from U.S. Highway 71.

The route is legally defined as Legislative Route 165 in the Minnesota Statutes. It is not marked with this number.

History
Highway 46 was authorized in 1933.

By 1953, there was one remaining gravel section in the middle of this route. It was completely paved by 1958.

Major intersections

References

046
Transportation in Itasca County, Minnesota
Transportation in Koochiching County, Minnesota